Hemoglobin subunit zeta is a protein that in humans is encoded by the HBZ gene.

Zeta-globin is an alpha-like hemoglobin. The zeta-globin polypeptide is synthesized in the yolk sac of the early embryo, while alpha-globin is produced throughout fetal and adult life. The zeta-globin gene is a member of the human alpha-globin gene cluster that includes five functional genes and two pseudogenes. The order of genes is: 5' - zeta - pseudozeta - mu - pseudoalpha-1 - alpha-2 - alpha-1 - theta1 - 3'.

References

Further reading 

 
 
 
 
 
 
 
 
 
 
 
 
 
 
 
 
 

Hemoglobins